Douglas is a city in Converse County, Wyoming, United States. The population was 6,120 at the 2010 census. It is the county seat of Converse County and the home of the Wyoming State Fair.

History

Douglas was platted in 1886 when the Wyoming Central Railway (later the Chicago and North Western Transportation Company) established a railway station; the settlement had been in existence since 1867 when Fort Fetterman was built and was first known as "Tent City" before it was officially named "Douglas", after Senator Stephen A. Douglas. It served as a supply point, warehousing and retail, for surrounding cattle ranches, as well as servicing railway crews, cowboys and the troops of the U.S. Army stationed at Fort Fetterman.

Douglas was the home of a World War II internment camp.

Its former railroad passenger depot is listed on the National Register of Historic Places.

Geography
Douglas is located at  (42.756008, -105.384555).

Climate
Douglas has a semi-arid climate (Köppen climate classification BSk).

Education
Public education in the city of Douglas is provided by Converse County School District #1. Zoned campuses include Douglas Primary School (grades k-1), Douglas Intermediate School (grades 2-3), Douglas Upper Elementary School (grades 4-5), Douglas Middle School (grades 6-8), Douglas High school (grades 9-12). Douglas is also home to the branch campus of Eastern Wyoming College, one of the state's seven community colleges.

Douglas has a public library, a branch of the Converse County Library

Culture

Douglas is located on the banks of the North Platte River, and is named for Stephen A. Douglas, U.S. Senator. The city grew after it was designated a stop on the Fremont, Elkhorn and Missouri Valley Railroad.  Railroads brought settlers and pioneers west; some stayed and others continued on.  Douglas' location affords excellent access to nearby sights. Medicine Bow National Forest is located nearby, as is Thunder Basin National Grassland and Ayres Natural Bridge. In 1996 Douglas was listed by Norman Crampton as one of The 100 Best Small Towns in America.

The former Fremont, Elkhorn and Missouri Valley Railroad Passenger Depot in Douglas is included on the National Register of Historic Places. The Douglas Chamber of Commerce, part of the Douglas Railroad Interpretive Center is located in the depot. The free of charge exhibition outside contains eight railroad vehicles, one steam locomotive with tender and seven cars.

Horse culture
Since Fort Fetterman days, Douglas has been a center of American horse culture.  The remains of the first winner of American racing's Triple Crown, thoroughbred Sir Barton, are buried here.  Today, Douglas is the location of the Wyoming State Fair, held every summer and known for its rodeo and animal competitions. Also on the fairgrounds is the Wyoming Pioneer Memorial Museum, a collection of pioneer and Native American relics pertaining to the history of Converse County.

Jackalopes

In 1932, the jackalope legend in the United States was attributed by The New York Times to Douglas Herrick (1920−2003) of Douglas, and thus the city was named the "Home of the Jackalope" by the state of Wyoming in 1985. Douglas has issued Jackalope Hunting licenses to tourists. The tags are good for hunting during official Jackalope season, which occurs for only one day, June 31.

According to the Douglas Chamber of Commerce, a 1930s hunting trip for jackrabbits led to the idea of a Jackalope. Herrick and his brother had studied taxidermy by mail order as teenagers. When the brothers returned from a hunting trip, Herrick tossed a jackrabbit carcass into the taxidermy shop, which rested beside a pair of deer antlers. The accidental combination of animal forms sparked Douglas Herrick's idea for a jackalope.

Wyoming State Fair

Each August Douglas hosts the Wyoming State Fair, not to be confused with Cheyenne Frontier Days Rodeo held in late July. The fair includes a carnival midway, live entertainment, and its own rodeo. On August 12, 2009, the fair hosted country music star John Anderson. The centennial fair in 2012 attracted sixty thousand persons, large by Wyoming standards; the Dierks Bentley concert was the first ever sold-out show in the fair.

The 101st fair opened in Douglas on August 10, 2013; it corresponds with the centennial of the Wyoming State 4-H Club, an active group in the annual fair. Fair performers will include country musicians Hunter Hayes and Brantley Gilbert.

Transportation

Highways
 North-South Interstate running from New Mexico to Wyoming; runs concurrent with US 87 through Douglas.
 I-25 Business, an alternate Business Route of I-25, running through the center of Douglas.

Airport
Air service is available 58 miles west of Douglas at Casper/Natrona County International Airport. The airport is located west of Casper, just off of US Highway 26. Passenger flights are offered by United Express (SkyWest Airlines), Delta Connection (SkyWest Airlines), and Allegiant Airlines.

Radio stations
KKTY (AM) 1470 and 93.3FM, Classic Hits, Wyoming Cowboys, Denver Broncos, Colorado Rockies
KKTY-FM 100.1, Full-Service Country
KKTS-FM 99.3, Hot Adult Contemporary

Notable people
David R. Edwards (1938–2013), Republican member of the Wyoming House of Representatives (2001–2008), member of the Douglas City Council (1995–2001), Converse County commissioner (2009–2012), and a 30-year veteran of the United States Navy, interred at Douglas Park Cemetery
Michael John Sullivan (born 1939), Governor of Wyoming, 1987–1995
George H. Cross (1854–1946), state senator (1895–1897; 1909–1913)

References

External links

 Douglas Photos From Wyoming Tales and Trails

 
Cities in Wyoming
Cities in Converse County, Wyoming
County seats in Wyoming
Populated places established in 1886